Tippecanoe Township is one of thirteen townships in Tippecanoe County, Indiana, United States. As of the 2010 census, its population was 7,702 and it contained 3,085 housing units.

History
Archeological Sites 12T59 and 12T530, Cairo Skywatch Tower, and Indiana State Soldiers Home Historic District are listed on the National Register of Historic Places.

Geography

Cities and towns
 Battle Ground
 West Lafayette (northeast edge)

Unincorporated communities
 Ash Grove at 
 Cairo at 
(This list is based on USGS data and may include former settlements.)

Extinct towns
 Harrisonville

Adjacent townships
 Prairie Township, White County (north)
 Deer Creek Township, Carroll County (east)
 Washington Township (east)
 Fairfield Township (south)
 Wabash Township (southwest)

Cemeteries
The township contains these six cemeteries: Battle Ground, Cairo, Harvey, Pierce, Pretty Prairie and Swisher-Hurtz.

Major highways
  Interstate 65
  Indiana State Road 43

Airports and landing strips
 Oahnke Airport

Rivers
 Tippecanoe River

School districts
 Tippecanoe School Corporation

Political districts
 Indiana's 4th congressional district
 State House District 26
 State House District 41
 State Senate District 07
After the 2011 redistricting by the Indiana Legislature, Tippecanoe Township will no longer include State House Districts 26 & 41 but instead will be included in State House District 25.  http://www.in.gov/legislative/house_republicans/rd/pdfs/House.pdf

References
 United States Census Bureau 2007 TIGER/Line Shapefiles
 United States Board on Geographic Names (GNIS)
 United States National Atlas

External links
 Indiana Township Association
 United Township Association of Indiana

Townships in Tippecanoe County, Indiana
Lafayette metropolitan area, Indiana
Townships in Indiana